Jorge Emanuel Molina (born 4 March 1987) is an Argentine professional footballer who plays as a midfielder for Tristán Suárez.

Career
Molina's career started in the youth ranks of Rio Tercero and Deportivo Merlo respectively. His senior career began with Deportivo Armenio, prior to a move to Turkish football to join TFF First League team Altay. For Altay, he participated in 41 league matches and scored 5 goals; he also featured six times in the Turkish Cup. He remained in Turkey between 2008 and 2010, he then joined Colombian Categoría Primera B side Deportivo Pasto in 2010. A year later, Molina agreed to sign for Real Cartagena of Categoría Primera A. He made his Real Cartagena debut on 5 February 2011 in a league win against Atlético Junior.

He scored his first goal for them in his fourth appearance on 27 February versus Once Caldas. 2012 saw Molina join Primeira Liga team Vitória Guimarães, but he left a few months later after just two appearances in all competitions. He returned to Colombian football in late 2012 and subsequently had spells with Cúcuta Deportivo and Santa Fe. Molina had a secondary spell with Deportivo Pasto in 2014, before joining Primera B Nacional side Atlético Tucumán in Argentina. 32 appearances and 9 goals followed for Molina as he helped Atlético Tucumán win promotion into the 2016 Argentine Primera División in his first season.

On 9 May 2017, it was confirmed Molina failed a drugs test after a match against Sarmiento in March. He tested positive for betamethasone, a substance that was banned in 2016. However, both the player and the club claimed Molina unknowingly consumed the substance in his recovery from a ligament rupture injury. He served an eight-month ban after being allowed to play again in January 2018. Six months later, Villa Dálmine of Primera B Nacional signed Molina.

Career statistics
.

Honours
Santa Fe
Superliga Colombiana: 2013

Atlético Tucumán
Primera B Nacional: 2015

References

External links
 

1987 births
Living people
Sportspeople from Córdoba Province, Argentina
Argentine footballers
Association football midfielders
Argentine expatriate footballers
Expatriate footballers in Turkey
Expatriate footballers in Colombia
Expatriate footballers in Portugal
Argentine expatriate sportspeople in Turkey
Argentine expatriate sportspeople in Colombia
Argentine expatriate sportspeople in Portugal
Doping cases in association football
Argentine sportspeople in doping cases
TFF First League players
Categoría Primera B players
Categoría Primera A players
Primeira Liga players
Primera Nacional players
Argentine Primera División players
Deportivo Armenio footballers
Altay S.K. footballers
Deportivo Pasto footballers
Real Cartagena footballers
Vitória S.C. players
Cúcuta Deportivo footballers
Independiente Santa Fe footballers
Atlético Tucumán footballers
Villa Dálmine footballers
Club Agropecuario Argentino players
Atlético de Rafaela footballers
CSyD Tristán Suárez footballers